Lake Matano, also known as Matana, is a natural lake in East Luwu Regency, South Sulawesi province, Indonesia. The surface elevation from mean sea level is only , which means that the deepest portion of the lake is below sea level (cryptodepression). It is one of the two major lakes (the other being Lake Towuti) in the Malili Lake system.

Endemic animals and plants 
Lake Matano is home to many species of endemic fish and other animals (e.g. Caridina shrimps, Parathelphusid crabs and Tylomelania snails) as well as many plants. The endemic fishes of Matano have been compared to the species swarms of the Rift Valley Lakes of Africa. While not as diverse, they are thought to have all arisen from a single ancestor species and diversified into numerous different species, which now fill many of the previously vacant ecological niches, as can be seen in the family Telmatherinidae. Endemic and near-endemic fishes from other families include Glossogobius matanensis,  Mugilogobius adeia, Nomorhamphus weberi and Oryzias matanensis. Many of the endemics are seriously threatened due to pollution and predation/competition from a wide range of introduced fishes, including flowerhorn cichlids. 

The water snake Enhydris matannensis is only known from the vicinity of Lake Matano and on Muna Island.

Chemistry 
Below the top layer of oxygenated water, Lake Matano's depths are anoxic, free of sulfates, and rich in iron. These conditions make Lake Matano an analog for Earth's oceans during the Archean Eon, which is useful for studying relationships between anoxygenic phototrophs and banded iron formations. The lake contains a population of green sulfur bacteria that conducts photosynthesis with bacteriochlorophyll e.

Lake Matano Festival
To lure foreign tourists of the beauty of Lake Matano and surrounding as a new icon of South Sulawesi, the first annually Lake Matano Festival was held in May 2015 with some attractions such as competition of running, cycling and swimming.

See also
 List of lakes of Indonesia

References 

Matano
Landforms of South Sulawesi